Ed is a train station in Dals-Ed, Västra Götaland, Sweden. To the east, the Norway/Vänern Line continues to Gothenburg Central Station. To the west, the Norway/Vänern Line crosses the border to Norway, and continues as the Østfold Line.

Trains

Railway stations in Västra Götaland County